1997 Super League season or 1997 Super League premiership may refer to the following rugby league football competitions:
 Super League II, in Europe
 1997 Super League (Australia) season